List of chairmen of the People's Assembly of the Republic of Ingushetia.

This is a list of chairmen (speakers) of the People's Assembly of the Republic of Ingushetia:

Footnote and references

Lists of legislative speakers in Russia
Politics of Ingushetia